is a Japanese writer of fan guides and novels, as well as a radio co-host. His work  was the basis for the 1997 Satoshi Kon anime film Perfect Blue and a 2002 live-action film titled Perfect Blue: Yume Nara Samete. Takeuchi's book Ultraman Visits the Grave is about a young boy who happens to be a fan of Ultraman. Takeuchi has expressed interest in getting his work translated for an English-speaking audience. Seven Seas Entertainment has optioned the English-language rights to the Perfect Blue novels for Q4 2017 and Q1 2018, respectively.

Bibliography
 (1982, Shogakukan)
The History of Toho Special Effects Movies (1983)
 (March 1991)
 (March 1998, Metamor Publishing) (reprint of Perfect Blue: Complete Metamorphosis)
Perfect Blue: Awaken from a Dream (2002)
The Promise of Gachopon (2009)
Wanting to meet Arashi (2010)
Ultraman Visits the Grave (November 2011)

References

External links
 

1955 births
20th-century Japanese novelists
21st-century Japanese novelists
People from Wakayama Prefecture
Living people